Lynn Solotaroff (October 21, 1929 – March 21, 1994) was an American translator of Tolstoy and Chekhov, among others, from Russian to English. She was also an academic and educator.

Biography
She was born as Lynn Friedman in Brooklyn, New York. She graduated from the University of Michigan and studied Russian as a graduate student at the University of Chicago and Columbia University. She was a visiting scholar at the then-Russian Institute at Columbia University—now known as the Harriman Institute—and worked as its director of publications from 1977 to 1985.

Among the books she translated was Tolstoy's The Death of Ivan Ilyich (1981) and The Man with the Shattered World by Alexander Luria. She also contributed to Avrahm Yarmolinsky's translation of Letters of Anton Chekhov (1973).

For the last several years of her life she taught English as a Second Language (ESL) at, among other schools, City College of New York and Touro College.

She died at the Jewish Home & Hospital in New York City from  lung cancer and emphysema, aged 64, on Monday, March 21, 1994. She was survived by two sons from her only marriage, to Ted Solotaroff, which ended in divorce, and by two sisters.

External links
New York Times obituary
Harvard University review of Lynn Solotaroff's work

1929 births
1994 deaths
20th-century American educators
20th-century American Jews
Russian–English translators
Columbia University faculty
Deaths from emphysema
Deaths from lung cancer in New York (state)
University of Michigan alumni
20th-century American translators
20th-century American women writers
American women academics